Parandrita is a genus of beetles in the family Laemophloeidae, containing the following species:

 Parandrita aenea Sharp
 Parandrita capito Grouvelle
 Parandrita cephalotes LeConte
 Parandrita deceptor Sharp
 Parandrita gracilis Sharp
 Parandrita konae Sharp
 Parandrita liturata Sharp
 Parandrita molokaiae Sharp
 Parandrita perkinsi Sharp
 Parandrita permixtus Grouvelle
 Parandrita stipes Sharp

References

Laemophloeidae